Hugh Wilson is a former Scottish football manager, who worked for Alloa Athletic and Cowdenbeath.

Wilson worked as chief scout for Alloa Athletic for 10 years until he was appointed manager in October 1974. He guided Alloa to promotion in 1976–77, but the club was relegated in 1977–78. Wilson resigned as Alloa manager near to the end of the 1979–80 season, and was replaced by Alex Totten. He then worked as chief scout for Falkirk for two years before being appointed manager of Cowdenbeath.

References

Year of birth unknown
Possibly living people
Scottish football managers
Alloa Athletic F.C. managers
Falkirk F.C. non-playing staff
Cowdenbeath F.C. managers
Scottish Football League managers